Nidaliidae is a family of soft corals in the phylum Cnidaria. Some members of this family are similar in appearance to gorgonians (sea fans). They are difficult to keep in the reef aquarium because they do not contain symbiotic zooxanthellae and therefore need to be fed on zooplankton. Others, in the genera Agaricoidea, Nidalla and  Pieterfaurea, more resemble members of the family Nephtheidae and these are somewhat easier to keep in the aquarium.

Genera
The World Register of Marine Species includes the following genera in the family:

Agaricoides Simpson, 1905 
Chironephthya Studer, 1887 
Nephthyigorgia Kükenthal, 1910 
Nidalia Gray, 1834
Nidaliopsis Kükenthal, 1906 
Orlikia Malyutin, 1993
Siphonogorgia Kölliker, 1874

References

 
Cnidarian families
Taxa named by John Edward Gray
Alcyoniina